Advanced Air is an American scheduled commuter and private charter airline based in Hawthorne, California, at the Hawthorne Municipal Airport where it also owns a fixed base operator, Jet Center Los Angeles.

History

Advanced Air was founded in 2005. It began scheduled shuttle service in 2015. It won its first Essential Air Service contract for Silver City, New Mexico, in October 2018 and began service in January 2019. In 2021 the company received a second Essential Air Service contract for Merced, California. In 2022 a subsidized contract through the state of New Mexico was received to serve Gallup, New Mexico from Phoenix. The service began on August 1, 2022.

Advanced Air offers select California shuttle routes in partnership with Surf Air. Surf Air manages the membership program while Advanced owns and operates the aircraft in the Surf Air livery. All partner flights are operated on the Pilatus PC-12.

In December 2019, Advanced Air began operating two Dornier 328JETs owned by the Taos Ski Valley and flown under the name Taos Air. Advanced Air operated flights during the 2019-2020 winter season from Taos, New Mexico to Austin and Dallas, Texas as well as Hawthorne and Carlsbad, California. Due to the COVID-19 pandemic, service was suspended for the 2020–2021 ski season but resumed for the summer months of 2021 as well as the 2021-2022 winter ski season. Advanced Air then acquired its own Dornier 328JET and began flights to Mammoth Mountain, California from Burbank, Hawthorne, and Carlsbad for the 2021-2022 ski season.

Destinations

Scheduled commercial

Former destinations

Fleet

Commuter 

Beechcraft Super King Air 350 – 7 (1 standby in Hawthorne, 1 standby in Silver City)

Shuttle and private charter
Pilatus PC-12 – 8
Learjet 75 – 1
King Air 350 – 7
Dornier 328JET – 2 (2 operated for Taos Air)
Bombardier Challenger 300 – 2

References

External links
 

Regional airlines of the United States
Airlines established in 2005
Charter airlines of the United States
Airlines based in California
Hawthorne, California
Companies based in Los Angeles County, California